(Cycloheptatrienyl)(cyclopentadienyl)titanium is an organotitanium compound with the formula Ti(C7H7)(C5H5).  It is a blue, diamagnetic, sublimable solid that is sensitive toward air. The structure has been confirmed by X-ray crystallography. This sandwich complex features cyclopentadienyl and cycloheptatrienyl ligands bound to titanium. The Ti-C distances are all within a narrow range near 2.35 Å.  

The complex can be prepared by the reaction of titanocene dichloride, butyllithium, and cycloheptatriene.

See also
(Cycloheptatrienyl)(cyclopentadienyl)vanadium

References

Titanium(II) compounds
Cyclopentadienyl complexes
Cycloheptatrienyl complexes
Sandwich compounds